Conradi is a surname. It comes from the Germanic Konrad: kuoni and rad meaning happy or laughing or rat meaning daring/experienced counsel.

 August Conradi (1821–1873), German composer
 Edward Conradi (1869–1944), American educator and administrator
 Erwin Conradi (born 1935), German manager
 Demoiselle Conradi (died 1720), German opera singer
 Johann Georg Conradi (1645–1699), German composer
 Ludwig R. Conradi (1856–1939), Seventh-day Adventist missionary
 Maurice Conradi (1896–1947), a White Russian officer
 Peter Conradi, British author and journalist
 Peter J. Conradi (born 1945), British author and academic

See also
 Conradi–Hünermann syndrome
 Conrad (disambiguation)

References

Surnames from given names